Bernadette Hall  (born 1945) is a New Zealand playwright and poet.

Biography
Hall was born in 1945 in Alexandra, New Zealand. She was raised in what she describes as "a small-city Catholic community that was proud, theatrical and pretty much enclosed." After a career as a teacher of Latin and classical studies, she started writing full-time in her forties. She has held residencies at both Canterbury University and Victoria University and is widely published. She spent 10 years as the editor of Takahe magazine and five as the poetry editor of The Press, Christchurch's main daily newspaper.

Hall's poetry collection The Lustre Jug was a finalist in the 2010 New Zealand Post Book Awards.

She is the patron of Hagley Writers' Institute.

Works

Plays 
 Glad and the Angels (1992)
 The Clothesline (1993)
 The Girl Who Sings Waterfalls (1992)

Poetry collections 
 Heartwood (Caxton Press, Christchurch, 1989)
 of Elephants etc. (Untold Press, 1990)
 The Persistent Levitator (Victoria University Press, 1994)
 Still Talking (Victoria University Press, 1997)
 Settler Dreaming (Victoria University Press, 2001)
 The Merino Princess: Selected Poems (Victoria University Press, 2004)
 The Ponies (Victoria University Press, 2007)
 The Lustre Jug (Victoria University Press, 2009)
 Life & Customs (Victoria University Press, 2014)

Awards and honours 
 1991 – Writer in residence at the University of Canterbury
 1996 – Robert Burns Fellowship at the University of Otago
 2004 – Antarctica New Zealand Arts Fellowship
 2006 – Writer's fellowship at Victoria University
 2015 – Prime Minister's Awards for Literary Achievement in Poetry
 2017 – Appointed a Member of the New Zealand Order of Merit, for services to literature, in the 2017 New Year Honours

References

1945 births
20th-century New Zealand poets
New Zealand women poets
New Zealand schoolteachers
People from Alexandra, New Zealand
New Zealand editors
New Zealand women editors
New Zealand magazine editors
Women magazine editors
New Zealand Roman Catholics
20th-century New Zealand dramatists and playwrights
Living people
New Zealand women dramatists and playwrights
International Writing Program alumni
Members of the New Zealand Order of Merit
21st-century New Zealand poets
21st-century New Zealand women writers
20th-century New Zealand women writers